North Warren is a census-designated place located along the Conewango Creek in Conewango Township, Warren County in the state of Pennsylvania, United States.  The community is located to the north of the city of Warren.  As of the 2010 census the population was 1,934 residents.

Demographics

References

Census-designated places in Warren County, Pennsylvania
Census-designated places in Pennsylvania